Deh No. 22 Jamrao also known as Chak No. 22 in Sanghar District (Urdu: ضلع سانگھڑ; Sindhi: ضلعو سانگھڙ) is one of the largest villages in district Sanghar of Sindh province, Pakistan. It is located between Sanghar and Nawab Shah districts and is bounded to the north by Khairpur district. Haji Abdul Rasheed safaid poosh ,Numberdaar Haji Farooque Arain, Choudhary Munawar Iqbal, Jamal Din Arain are the famous personalities from this village.
Acc is the best cricket club of the village.Late  Nadir Ali was the first and best captain of the club. Muhammad Asif have been the most winning captain of the team for 20 years. Famous player Numberdaar Haji Farooq was one of the best hard hitting batsman in the district at his time. Rashid Kaka, Imtaiz Ali, Haseeb Alam, Asif Khadim, Abdul Wahab Munna. Abdul Waheed Gugala were Best all-rounders from this village.

Deh No. 22 Jamrao is roughly 50 miles (60 km) away from Nawabshah in south easterly direction towards Sanghar. Its neighbouring villages are Chak 22- A Alf,  Chak No. 24, Chak 25/A/B/C/ and Makhai area. The village is mainly an agricultural area. Its primary source of income is agriculture. According to the 2010 census of Pakistan, the population was 10,053.

Schools 
 

 Ambassador Public School is one of the leading schools in town.
 The Government Higher Secondary School was formally opened by Salahuddin Qureshi Civil Services of Pakistan on 8 November 1965 under the name District Council High School Deh 22 Jamrao. Its headmaster is Sain Ghulam Ghous Arain Sahib, who took this position on 21 September 2018. One of its most experienced teachers was Sain Arshad Ali Jat (born 1956; died 20 June 2014). The teachers Sain Ishaque, Sain Latif and Sain Laiquat retired in May 2014. The best teacher of this school is Sir Abdul Ghaffar Arain was retired in December,2019. He was a best English and science teacher of this school. The students who are living with this teacher are doing very good jobs today in private and public sectors.
 The Government Boys Primary School provides basic education for young boys.

References 

deh no. 22 jamrao constituted as Union Council, and Choudhry Munawar Iqbal Arain is elected as first chairman.

Sanghar District